Ayrton Ariel Sánchez (born 6 March 2000) is an Argentine footballer currently playing as a eft-back for Brown de Adrogué.

Career statistics

Club

References

2000 births
Living people
Argentine footballers
Argentine expatriate footballers
Footballers from Córdoba, Argentina
Association football defenders
Uruguayan Segunda División players
Boca Juniors footballers
Central Español players
Club Atlético Brown footballers
Argentine expatriate sportspeople in Uruguay
Expatriate footballers in Uruguay